Dental microwear analysis is a method to infer diet and behavior in extinct animals, especially in fossil specimens. Typically, the patterns of pits and scratches on the occlusal or buccal surface of the enamel are compared with patterns observed in extant species to infer ecological information. Hard foods in particular can lead to distinctive patterns (although see below). Microwear can also be used for inferring behavior, especially those related to the non-masticatory use of teeth as 'tools'. Other uses include investigating weaning in past populations. Methods used to collect data initially involved a microscope and manually collecting information on individual microwear features, but software to automatically collect data have improved markedly in recent years.

Potential issues and on-going debates 

 The role of phytoliths and environmental grit in creating microwear features is not well understood and recent research suggests such items may create a surprisingly large amount of the microwear features visible in fossil samples
 A recent study suggests hard food, or at least some types, may not contribute significantly to microwear textures
 Dental microwear is rapidly turned over during life and therefore may only give information about the last few days of an individuals life. In particular, this 'last supper' affect may create a severely biased sample

References 

Paleontology